Khaneqah-e Olya (also Romanized as Khāneqāh-e ‘Olyā) is a village in Kivanat Rural District, Kolyai District, Sonqor County, Kermanshah Province, Iran. At the 2006 census, its population was 137, in 29 families.

Notes 

Populated places in Sonqor County